Bradley is a city in Lafayette County, Arkansas, United States. The population was 628 at the 2010 census.

Geography
Bradley is located in southern Lafayette County at  (33.098580, -93.657434). It sits at the intersection of Arkansas Highways 29 and 160. Highway 29 leads north  to Lewisville and south  to the Louisiana border at Arkana. Highway 160 leads east from Bradley  to the community of State Line and west  to Interstate 49 near Doddridge.

Demographics

As of the census of 2000, there were 563 people, 223 households, and 134 families residing in the city. The racial makeup of the city was 46.36% White, 52.40% Black or African American, 0.36% Asian, and 0.89% from two or more races.  0.71% of the population were Hispanic or Latino of any race.

There were 223 households, out of which 30.0% had children under the age of 18 living with them, 32.7% were married couples living together, 22.4% had a female householder with no husband present, and 39.9% were non-families.  37.2% of all households were made up of individuals, and 20.6% had someone living alone who was 65 years of age or older.  The average household size was 2.52 and the average family size was 3.38.

In the city, the population was spread out, with 33.6% under the age of 18, 9.6% from 18 to 24, 23.1% from 25 to 44, 17.9% from 45 to 64, and 15.8% who were 65 years of age or older.  The median age was 31 years. For every 100 females, there were 80.4 males.  For every 100 females age 18 and over, there were 70.8 males.

The median income for a household in the city was $14,375, and the median income for a family was $19,306. Males had a median income of $21,719 versus $14,688 for females. The per capita income for the city was $2,455.  About 43.9% of families and 49.6% of the population were below the poverty line, including 66.5% of those under age 18 and 42.2% of those age 65 or over.

Education 
Public education for elementary and secondary students is provided by the Emerson-Taylor-Bradley School District, which includes Bradley Elementary School and Bradley High School. The school's mascot and athletic emblem is the Bear, with purple and gold serving as the school colors.

The former Bradley School District consolidated into the Emerson-Taylor district effective July 1, 2013.

Infrastructure

Highways
  Arkansas Highway 29
  Arkansas Highway 160

References

External links
"Bradley (Lafayette County)" at The Encyclopedia of Arkansas
Community blog (last updated 2012)

Cities in Arkansas
Cities in Lafayette County, Arkansas